Brusnik is a Slavic toponym, derived from brusnica, meaning "cranberry" or "cowberry".

Brusnik (Брусник), in Serbo-Croatian and Macedonian, may refer to:
 Brusnik, Bitola, a village in R. Macedonia
 Brusnik, Ivanjica, a village in Serbia
 Brusnik, Zaječar, a village in Serbia
 Brusnik, Vučitrn, a village in Kosovo
 Brusnik, Srbac, a village in Croatia
 Brusnik, Negotino, a village in R. Macedonia
 Brusnik, Pakrac, a village in Croatia
 Brusnik (island), a volcanic island in the Adriatic Sea

Brusník, in Slovak, may refer to:
 Brusník, a village and municipality in Slovakia

Bruśnik, in Polish, may refer to:
 Bruśnik, a village in Poland

See also
Brusnica (disambiguation)
Brusnice

Serbo-Croatian place names